The Roman Catholic Diocese of Trois-Rivières (erected 8 June 1852) is a suffragan of the Archdiocese of Québec.

History
The Diocese of Trois-Rivières was erected from the Archdiocese of Quebec on June 8, 1852. Rev. Thomas Cooke was appointed the first bishop. At that time, the diocese extended to the Eastern Townships, and included thirty-nine parishes.

The Collège des Trois-Rivières was founded in 1860; in 1874, it became the diocesan seminary. Also in 1874, the Diocese of Sherbrooke was created from Trois-Rivières. Notre-Dame-du-Cap was designated a national pilgrimage site by the bishops of Canada in 1909.

Bishops

Ordinaries
Thomas Cooke (1852 - 1870)
Louis-François Richer dit Laflèche (1870 - 1898)
François-Xavier Cloutier (1899 - 1934)
Alfred-Odilon Comtois (1934 - 1945)
Maurice Roy (1946 - 1947), appointed Archbishop of Québec
Georges-Léon Pelletier (1947 - 1975)
Laurent Noël (1975 - 1996)
Martin Veillette (1996 - 2012)
Luc-André Bouchard (2012 - 2021)
Martin Laliberté, P.M.E. (2022–present)

Coadjutor bishop
 Louis-François Richer dit Laflèche (1866-1870)

Auxiliary bishops
 Pierre Olivier Tremblay, O.M.I. (2018- )

Another priest of this diocese who became bishop
 Jean-Guy Hamelin, appointed Bishop of Rouyn-Noranda, Québec

Territorial losses

References

Bibliography

External links
 diocesan website

Trois Rivieres
Organizations based in Quebec
Trois-Rivières